Japan competed at the 2010 Summer Youth Olympics, the inaugural Youth Olympic Games, held in Singapore from 14 August to 26 August 2010.

Medalists

|  style="text-align:left; width:78%; vertical-align:top;"|

|  style="text-align:left; width:22%; vertical-align:top;"|

Archery

Boys

Girls

Mixed Team

Athletics

Boys
Track and Road Events

Field Events

Girls
Track and Road Events

Field Events

Badminton

Boys

Girls

Basketball

Girls

Cycling

Cross Country

Time Trial

BMX

Road Race

Overall

Gymnastics

Artistic Gymnastics

Boys

Girls

Rhythmic Gymnastics 

Team

Trampoline

Judo

Individual

Team

Rowing

Sailing

Windsurfing

Swimming

Boys

Girls

Mixed

Table tennis

Individual

Team

Tennis

Singles

Doubles

Triathlon

Yuka Sato won the first gold medal of the Youth Olympic Games.

Girls

Men's

Mixed

Volleyball

Weightlifting

Wrestling

Freestyle

References

External links

Competitors List: Japan – Singapore 2010 official site
 Schedule/Results – Singapore 2010 official site

2010 in Japanese sport
Nations at the 2010 Summer Youth Olympics
Japan at the Youth Olympics